The 616th Bombardment Squadron was activated in 1943 as one of the four squadrons of the 477th Bombardment Group, the first (and only) bombardment group in the United States Army Air Forces to include black pilots.  Members of the squadron participated in the Freeman Field Mutiny, protesting racial segregation in the military.  The squadron was inactivated in 1945 when the 477th became a composite group that included bombardment and fighter squadrons.

History
The 616th Bombardment Squadron was activated in June 1943 at MacDill Field, Florida, as one of the four original squadrons of the 477th Bombardment Group, but was inactivated in August.

The 477th group was reactivated in January 1944 at Selfridge Field, Michigan as the "first colored bombardment group in the Army Air Forces" with personnel drawn from Selfridge and from Tuskegee Army Air Field, Alabama.  It was the second combat group to be activated with African American personnel and would be the only African-American bombardment group.  The group moved to Godman Field, Kentucky in May.  The unit encountered problems attributed to the lack of experienced personnel, which required even basic training in military occupational specialties to be conducted within the unit, rather than at technical training schools.

The initial commander of the 477th group enforced the then-standard practice of racial segregation on the posts where the squadron was stationed.  The squadron's members were involved in the civil rights action referred to as the Freeman Field Mutiny; the "mutiny" came about when African-American aviators became outraged enough by racial segregation in the military that they resorted to mass insistence that military regulations prohibiting discrimination be enforced. The Freeman Field Mutiny was a crucial event in the African-American struggle for equal civil rights.

The 616th was inactivated in June 1945 as the 477th became a composite group formed of the 99th Fighter Squadron, 617th Bombardment Squadron and 618th Bombardment Squadron. At this time, Colonel Benjamin O. Davis, Jr., a black officer, assumed command of the group.

Lineage
 Constituted as the 616th Bombardment Squadron (Medium) on 13 May 1943
 Activated on 1 June 1943
 Inactivated on 25 August 1943
 Activated on 15 January 1944
 Inactivated on 22 June 1945

Assignments
 477th Bombardment Group: 1 June 1943 – 25 August 1943
 477th Bombardment Group (later 477th Composite Group): 15 May 1944 – 22 June 1945

Stations
 MacDill Field, Florida: 1 June 1943 – 25 August 1943
 Selfridge Field, Michigan: 15 January 1944
 Godman Field, Kentucky: 6 May 1944
 Sturgis Army Air Field, Kentucky: 19 June 1944
 Godman Field, Kentucky: 20 July 1944
 Freeman Field, Indiana: 5 March 1945
 Godman Field, Kentucky: 27 April 1945 – 22 June 1945

Aircraft
 Martin B-26 Marauder, 1943
 North American B-25 Mitchell, 1944–1945

See also
 Tuskegee Airmen
 B-25 Mitchell units of the United States Army Air Forces
 List of Martin B-26 Marauder operators

References

Notes
 Explanatory notes

 Citations

Bibliography

 
 
 

Military units and formations established in 1943
Bombardment squadrons of the United States Army Air Forces